Dayna is a given name. Among languages that use this name is Latvian, in which it (also spelled Daina) broadly means 'a collection of the best and most beautiful. For example, 'The Daina of music.' In contemporary adaptations of the name variations of the spelling of the name include "Dayna" or "Dana". As with most names ending in 'a' it is a name associated with the feminine.

Notable people with the name Dayna include:
Dayna Berghan-Whyman, medieval fighter from New Zealand
Dayna Curry (born 1971), an American aid worker who was captured by the Taliban
Dayna Cussler, an American film producer, writer, and actress
Dayna Deruelle (born 1982), a Canadian curler
Dayna Devon (born 1965), an American journalist
Dayna Edwards (born 1985), an Australian rugby union player
Dayna Kurtz, an American singer-songwriter
Dayna Manning (born 1978), a Canadian singer-songwriter
Dayna Stephens (born 1978), an American musician and composer
Dayna Vawdrey (born 1982), a New Zealand television presenter

Fictional characters
Dayna Jenkins, a character in Shortland Street
Dayna Jurgens, a character in The Stand
Dayna Mellanby, a character in Blake's 7

English-language unisex given names
Unisex given names
Feminine given names
Masculine given names